Sreeman Sreemathi is a 1981 Indian Malayalam film, directed by Hariharan and produced by Gopi. The film stars Srividya, Vijayan, Bahadoor and M. G. Soman in the lead roles. The film has musical score by G. Devarajan. The film was a remake of Tamil film Avargal.

Cast
Srividya
Vijayan
Bahadoor
M. G. Soman
Nagesh
Oduvil Unnikrishnan

Soundtrack
The music was composed by G. Devarajan and the lyrics were written by Mankombu Gopalakrishnan.

References

External links
 

1981 films
1980s Malayalam-language films
Malayalam remakes of Tamil films
Films directed by Hariharan